Gobindpur Assembly constituency is an assembly constituency for Bihar Legislative Assembly in Nawada district of Bihar, India. It comes under Nawada (Lok Sabha constituency).

Members of Legislative Assembly

Election results

2020

References

External links
 

Assembly constituencies of Bihar